Fyodor L. Zak ( (born December 2, 1949, in Moscow) is a Russian mathematician working on mathematical economics and algebraic geometry who classified the Scorza varieties.

Publications

References

Further reading

Mathematicians from Moscow
1949 births
Living people